Hollywood Hero, released as Western Culture in the UK, is an album by punk band Sham 69. It was released in the US on August 21, 2007 by SOS Records and in the UK on November 26, 2007 by Bad Dog Records. This is the first Sham 69 album without the original vocalist Jimmy Pursey.

Track listing
All songs by Jimmy Pursey and Dave Parsons unless noted
 "Asbo Sports Day" - 2:51
 "No Apologies" - 3:17
 "Western Culture" - 2:26
 "Medic" - 2:53
 "Here Come the Lies" - 2:46
 "I Want Glory" - 4:25 (Edwards, Parsons)
 "Hollywood Hero" - 2:17
 "I Don't Believe a Word" - 2:09 (Parsons)
 "Give Me a Minute" - 3:01
 "New York City" - 2:46
 "I Love Her" - 3:07
 "Bit the Bullet" - 5:00

Personnel
Sham 69
Tim Scazz - vocals
Dave Parsons - guitar, producer, liner notes
Rob "Zee" Jefferson - bass
Ian Whitewood - drums, producer

References 

2007 albums
Sham 69 albums